Bulić is a Serbo-Croatian surname. It may refer to:

Bruno Bulić (born 1958), Yugoslav cyclist
Frane Bulić (1846–1934), Croatian priest, archaeologist and historian
Jerko Bulić (1924-2008), Yugoslav sprinter
Karlo Bulić (1910-1986), Croatian actor
Mate Bulić (born 1945), Croatian pop-folk singer
Radosav Bulić (born 1977), Montenegrin football midfielder
Rasim Bulić (born 2000), German footballer
Vanja Bulić (born 1947), Serbian journalist and author

See also
Balić, surname
Belić, surname
Bilić (surname)
Bolić, surname

Croatian surnames
Montenegrin surnames
Serbian surnames
Bosnian surnames